Cululú is a village in Argentina, located in the Las Colonias Department of Santa Fe Province.

People 
Its most notable resident was Emiliano Sala, a professional footballer who played for Bordeaux and Nantes, and who died due to a plane crash in January 2019.

References

Populated places in Santa Fe Province
Populated places established in 1866
1866 establishments in Argentina